Ethmia duckworthi is a moth in the family Depressariidae. It is found in Panama and Costa Rica.

The ground color of the forewings is whitish, more or less uniformly covered by irregular, mostly ill-defined, dark brownish gray longitudinal streaks and spots. The ground color of the hindwings is semi-translucent whitish basally, becoming dark brown at the apical area and along the dorsal margin.

References

Moths described in 1973
duckworthi